Zhongsha (p Zhōngshā) is the Chinese name for the Macclesfield Bank in the South China Sea.

Zhongsha may also refer to:

 The Zhongsha Islands, other submerged sea features around the Macclesfield Bank
 Zhongsha District, a Chinese county-level area responsible for "administration" of these features
 Zhongsha, Shanghai, part of the Jiuduansha shoals off Pudong